This is the discography of English rock singer Dave Berry.

Albums

Studio albums

Compilation albums

EPs

Singles

Notes

References 

Discographies of British artists
Rock music discographies